Warren Ralph Richardson (born August 2, 1940 in Moncton, New Brunswick) is the former chancellor of Atlantic Baptist University (now Crandall University) in Canada.

Richardson was educated at Moncton High School, the New Brunswick Bible Institute, and the United Baptist Bible Training School (the institution that he would later lead under a different name), all in Moncton. He then went to Gordon College in Massachusetts, earning a B.A. in Biblical Studies and History in 1966 and continuing there for a master of divinity in 1969. He returned to Moncton as pastor of the Lewisville United Baptist Church, and then in 1971 joined the faculty of Atlantic Baptist College, as the former United Baptist Bible Training School was then called. After several administrative positions, he became president of the college in 1986, and continued to serve as president until 2000. Under his presidency, the college moved to a new campus and renamed itself again, to Atlantic Baptist University, in 1996. In 2000, after stepping down as president, he became the first chancellor of the university. In 2009, he retired as chancellor in favor of Jack Stultz, and in the same year was given the university's Distinguished Alumni Award.

References

1940 births
Living people
Canadian Baptist theologians
Canadian university and college chancellors
People from Moncton
Gordon College (Massachusetts) alumni